Chigali is a popular tangy Tamarind treat usually made in Southern India, especially in the state of Karnataka. Chigali is also referred to as Imli ki Goli in Northern India. Chigali has become popular in recent days when a company, Havenow Foodtech Pvt. Ltd., introduced it widely into Indian FMCG market with a brand of "Chicley"

Etymology 
Chigali is word that originates from Kannada, the official language of state of Karnataka India. In Kannada, it is written as "ಚಿಗಳಿ".

Preparation and Ingredients 
The chief ingredient Tamarind is combined with other ingredients and pounded in a Kutni (ಕುಟ್ನಿ in Kannada, Mortar & Pestle in English) or in an Oralukallu, which gives it an even consistency. It is then rolled between the palms of the hand to make small round balls. Next, if preferred, they are stuck on sticks/tooth picks/straws/handles of spoon. In supermarkets and malls Chigali can be found wrapped in thin transparent covers as Chigali candies.

Ingredients may include any combination of:
 Tamarind
 Jaggery
 Sugar
 Salt
 Chili powder
 Lemon leaves
 Asafoetida
 Cumin seeds
Ghee or any vegetable oil
 Garlic
 Pepper

Others with similar names 
 Chigali Unde/Undi - A sweet dish also called Yellunde in  Karnataka made with Ellu (Black Sesame seeds) and Jaggery.
 Chigali - Place names
 A village (Chigali/Chigalli) 6 km away from Mundgod, in Belagavi Taluk Karnataka India.
 A place under Kurnool city in Andhra Pradesh India
 A place in the region of Southern, Zambia Africa.
 Chigali -  Iruve-chatni, a cuisine of Banakal, Karnataka India

See also 
 Household Stone tools in Karnataka for details of Oralukallu and Kutni

References

Indian confectionery
Karnataka cuisine